Borja Fernández Fernández (born 14 January 1981) is a Spanish former footballer who played as a defensive midfielder.

Having started his career at Real Madrid, he amassed La Liga totals of 222 matches and three goals over 11 seasons. He also represented in the competition Mallorca, Valladolid, Getafe and Eibar.

Fernández signed for ATK in 2014, winning the first Indian Super League.

Club career

Spain
Born in Ourense, Galicia, Fernández joined Real Madrid's academy in 1996 and, after impressive displays for the C and B teams, was promoted to the main squad in 2003. He appeared in 15 La Liga games that season – with his debut coming on 2 September 2003 in a 1–1 away draw against Villarreal CF– and eight in his second year (mostly as a late substitute).

Unable to break into the first team, Fernández was loaned to RCD Mallorca for the 2005–06 campaign, where he also played sparingly. He subsequently joined Segunda División club Real Valladolid, being instrumental in the side's top-flight promotion after a three-year hiatus and continuing to start regularly in the subsequent seasons under manager José Luis Mendilibar.

Fernández was again a defensive pillar for Valladolid in 2009–10, featuring in 31 matches as the Castile and León side was eventually relegated, as 19th. In late May 2010, he signed a four-year contract with Getafe CF.

In August 2011, Fernández returned to the second division and joined Deportivo de La Coruña, with Rubén Pérez heading in the opposite direction. He subsequently returned to Geta, scoring his first official goal for the team on 16 March 2013, the game's only at home against Athletic Bilbao.

India and Eibar
On 4 July 2014, at the age of 33, Fernández moved abroad for the first time, becoming the first signing for ATK of the Indian Super League and the very first signing in the league ever. He scored the second goal in the league's opening match, a 3–0 home victory over Mumbai City FC. In the next fixture he was sent off for two yellow cards in the 84th minute, but his team still won 2–0 at NorthEast United FC.

Fernández played a pivotal role for Atlético as they went on to win the championship, defeating Kerala Blasters FC in the final through a last-minute goal by Mohammed Rafique. On 31 December 2014 he returned to Spain, after agreeing to a six-month contract with top-tier club SD Eibar. His debut came on 16 January of the following year, replacing Javi Lara in added time of a 1–1 draw at Córdoba CF. He started in 14 of his appearances to help the Basques retain their status, scoring an equaliser in a 1–1 away draw against Getafe on 17 May.

On 17 June 2015, Fernández returned to ATK, succeeding his compatriot Luis García as the franchise's captain for their second campaign. He scored once in 15 matches – in a 4–0 home rout of FC Goa on 22 November– as his team were eliminated in the semi-finals by Chennaiyin FC.

Valladolid return and later years
Fernández returned to Valladolid on 25 January 2016, linking until the end of the second-division season. On 12 August, he rejoined Kolkata for the third ISL campaign.

On 17 January 2017, Fernández returned to Spain and its second tier after agreeing to a six-month deal with UD Almería. On 12 July, he returned to Valladolid for a third spell after signing a one-year contract.

After contributing sparingly as the latter side retained their top-flight status, the 38-year-old Borja announced his retirement in May 2019. He remained connected to his last club, in other capacities.

Club statistics

Honours
Valladolid
Segunda División: 2006–07

Deportivo
Segunda División: 2011–12

ATK
Indian Super League: 2014, 2016

References

External links
Deportivo official profile 

1981 births
Living people
Spanish footballers
Footballers from Ourense
Association football midfielders
La Liga players
Segunda División players
Segunda División B players
Real Madrid C footballers
Real Madrid Castilla footballers
Real Madrid CF players
RCD Mallorca players
Real Valladolid players
Getafe CF footballers
Deportivo de La Coruña players
SD Eibar footballers
UD Almería players
Indian Super League players
ATK (football club) players
Spain youth international footballers
Spain under-21 international footballers
Spanish expatriate footballers
Expatriate footballers in India
Spanish expatriate sportspeople in India